Giant-killing or giant killer may refer to:

Killing a literal giant, such as:
Gigantomachy, a Greek mythological battle
David and Goliath, a biblical story
"Jack the Giant Killer", a Cornish fairy tale and legend
Underdog, a person or group in a competition who is largely expected to lose
Upset (competition), occurring when an underdog beats the favourite (or top dog)
Giant Killing, a manga series with a 26-episode anime television series adaptation
Giantkiller, a DC Comics comic book series
Giant Killer (call sign), a military aviation call sign in the United States 
"Giant Killer" (story), a 1945 sci-fi short story by A. Bertram Chandler

See also
Giant Killers (disambiguation)
Jack the Giant Killer (disambiguation)